Cuando Cubango Futebol Clube or simply Cuando Cubango FC is an Angolan sports club from the city of Menongue, in the Angolan southern province of Cuando Cubango. The club was founded as Futebol Clube da Casa Militar.

In 2016, the team secured a place in the Gira Angola (Angola's second division championship) in 2016 after winning the Cuando Cubango province football championship.

In 2017, the club qualified for the Angolan top division, the Girabola.

In 2018, the club decided to change the name to Cuando Cubango Futebol Clube.

Financial difficulties 
On January 22, 2022, during the 2021-22 Girabola season, the club's management threatened to drop out of the competition, citing financial difficulties related to an expense of 300 million kwanzas, but revealing the club was working together with the government of the Cuando Cubango province to find a solution. Due to these circumstances, the club failed to attend an away game against Petro de Luanda, which resulted in a lost game, as per regulation.

Later, on the 10th of February, the Angolan government assured that, despite considering that the process of the club's founding was badly handled, Cuando Cubango FC would receive financial support until the end of the 2021-22 Girabola season.

Achievements 
Angolan League: 0

Angolan Cup: 0

Angolan SuperCup: 0

Gira Angola: 0

Cuando Cubango provincial championship: 1

League and cup positions

Staff

Players 

2016-2021

Manager history

See also 
Girabola
Gira Angola

External links 
 Match schedule
 Zerozero profile

References 

Football clubs in Angola
Sports clubs in Angola